William or Will Randall may refer to:

Politics
 William H. Randall (1812–1881), U.S. Representative from Kentucky
 William J. Randall (1909–2000), U.S. Representative from Missouri
 William Peter Randall (born 1964), Canadian musician and municipal politician
 William Randall (MP) for Weymouth

Sports
 William Randall (baseball) (1915–2013), American baseball player
 William Randall (cricketer) (1823–1877), English cricketer
 William Randall (weightlifter) (born 1888), British Olympic weightlifter
 Will Randall (footballer) (born 1995), English footballer

Others
 Will Randall (writer) (born 1966), English travel writer

See also
 William Randell (1824–1911), South Australian pioneer and riverboat captain
 William Crandall (fictional character)